In the 1914 season of the Campeonato Paulista, two championships were disputed, each by a different league.

APSA Championship 

In the APSA-organized Campeonato Paulista, the championship had doubled in size, with Ypiranga defecting from LPF, and the additions of Scottish Wanderers, formed by former São Paulo Athletic players, and São Bento. the latter was formed by former students of the Ginásio São Bento, and fielding some of the best players of the time, won the title in its debut. the top scorer was Ypiranga's Arthur Friedenreich with 12 goals.

System
The championship was disputed in a double-round robin system, with the team with the most points winning the title.

Championship

LPF Championship

The edition of the 1914 Campeonato Paulista organized by the LPF (Liga Paulista de Football) ended with Corinthians winning the title for the 1st time. the top scorer was Corinthians's Neco with 12 goals. That edition is also notable for being the first time a team from outside the cities of São Paulo and Santos participated in the Campeonato Paulista, this team being Hydecroft, from Jundiaí, which however, withdrew before the end of the championship.

System
The championship was disputed in a double-round robin system, with the team with the most points winning the title.

Championship

References

Campeonato Paulista seasons
Paulista